Ronald Harper Jr. (born April 12, 2000) is an American professional basketball player for the Toronto Raptors of the National Basketball Association (NBA), on a two-way contract with the Raptors 905 of the NBA G League. He played college basketball for the Rutgers Scarlet Knights of the Big Ten Conference. He is the son of former NBA player Ron Harper.

Early life and high school career
Harper was born in Paterson, New Jersey, while his father, Ron Harper, was playing for the Los Angeles Lakers in the NBA. He grew up playing basketball under the coaching of his mother, Maria. On the Amateur Athletic Union circuit, Harper competed for Ring City Basketball, a program owned by his parents. Raised in Upper Saddle River, New Jersey & Franklin Lakes, New Jersey, he attended Don Bosco Preparatory High School in Ramsey, New Jersey. As a junior, Harper averaged 10.1 points and 1.5 rebounds per game while shooting 37 percent from 3-point range. He helped his team win its first Non-Public A state title in 47 years. In his senior season, he averaged 20.8 points and 3.9 rebounds per game, leading his team to its second straight Non-Public A state championship. He scored a career-high 33 points in a loss to Roselle Catholic High School at the Tournament of Champions final. Harper was named North Jersey Player of the Year by The Record. He was considered a four-star recruit by Rivals but his only Power Five scholarship offers were from Nebraska and Rutgers. On August 11, 2017, he committed to play college basketball for Rutgers.

College career
In his collegiate debut against Fairleigh Dickinson, he posted 15 points. On March 2, 2019, Harper scored a freshman season-high 27 points for Rutgers in an 86–72 win over Iowa. As a freshman, he averaged 7.8 points and 3.1 rebounds per game. In the offseason, Harper improved his strength and conditioning, gaining 15 lbs (6.8 kg). During his sophomore season, he became a regular starter. On January 22, 2020, Harper recorded a season-high 29 points and nine rebounds in an 85–80 loss to Iowa. On February 25, he scored 27 points, shooting 5-of-5 from three-point range, in a 72–57 victory over Illinois. As a sophomore, he averaged 12.1 points and 5.8 rebounds per game. He earned All-Big Ten Honorable Mention and was named to the Second Team All-Met. On November 27, Harper scored a career-high 30 points with five-three pointers in a 96–75 win over Fairleigh Dickinson. As a junior, Harper helped lead Rutgers to their first NCAA Tournament in 30 years. He averaged 14.9 points and 5.9 rebounds per game. Following the season, Harper declared for the 2021 NBA draft, but ultimately opted to return to Rutgers.

On December 9, 2021, Harper tied his career high of 30 points to go with 10 rebounds against Purdue. He made the game-winning buzzer-beater from just inside halfcourt to give the Scarlet Knights a 70–68 win, giving Rutgers its first victory over a No. 1 ranked team. Harper was named to the Second Team All-Big Ten.

Following Rutgers' loss in the First Four of the 2022 NCAA men's basketball tournament, Harper announced his intention to forgo his final season of collegiate eligibility and declare for the 2022 NBA draft. He ultimately went undrafted.

Professional career

Toronto Raptors (2022–present)
On July 14, 2022, after being undrafted in the 2022 NBA draft, Harper signed a two-way contract with the Toronto Raptors. Bobby Webster noted that Wayne Embry (the Raptors' senior basketball advisor) was involved in both signing Ron Harper Jr. and drafting his father (Ron Harper).

Career statistics

College

|-
| style="text-align:left;"|2018–19
| style="text-align:left;"|Rutgers
| 31 || 19 || 22.3 || .413 || .278 || .679 || 3.1 || 1.1 || .6 || .5 || 7.8
|-
| style="text-align:left;"|2019–20
| style="text-align:left;"|Rutgers
| 31 || 31 || 28.1 || .452 || .349 || .708 || 5.8 || 1.0 || .8 || .8 || 12.1
|-
| style="text-align:left;"|2020–21
| style="text-align:left;"|Rutgers
| 27 || 27 || 32.0 || .441 || .310 || .736 || 5.9 || 1.6 || .7 || .6 || 14.9
|-
| style="text-align:left;"|2021–22
| style="text-align:left;"|Rutgers
| 32 || 32 || 34.3 || .442 || .398 || .795 || 5.9 || 1.9 || 1.0 || .6 || 15.8
|- class="sortbottom"
| style="text-align:center;" colspan="2"|Career
| 121 || 109 || 29.1 || .439 || .340 || .741 || 5.1 || 1.4 || .8 || .6 || 12.6

Personal life
His father, Ron Harper, was an All-American college basketball player at Miami (Ohio) and played in the NBA for 15 seasons, winning five NBA titles. His mother, Maria (née Pizarro), is from Bataan, Philippines and played college basketball for New Orleans, before becoming a coach. Harper's maternal grandfather represented the Philippines in jai alai at the 1968 Summer Olympics.

References

External links
 Rutgers Scarlet Knights bio

2000 births
Living people
American expatriate basketball people in Canada
American men's basketball players
American sportspeople of Filipino descent
Basketball players from Inglewood, California
Basketball players from New Jersey
Don Bosco Preparatory High School alumni
People from Franklin Lakes, New Jersey
Raptors 905 players
Rutgers Scarlet Knights men's basketball players
Shooting guards
Small forwards
Sportspeople from Bergen County, New Jersey
Toronto Raptors players
Undrafted National Basketball Association players